Kappar is a small town on the southwestern coast of Balochistan, Pakistan. It suffered damage from flooding in 2007.

References

Populated places in Balochistan, Pakistan